The European BioSafety Association (EBSA) is a non-profit organization, founded in June 1996, which provides a forum to its members to discuss and debate issues of concern and to represent those working in the field of biosafety and associated activities. Its mission is to enhance knowledge and understanding of biological safety throughout Europe and the world.

See also
European Centre for Disease Prevention and Control (ECDC)
Biosecurity Australia
Public health

Sources
 European BioSafety Association

Public health organizations
Organizations established in 1996
Safety organizations
European medical and health organizations